Yoonis Muse (born 11 May 2000) is a Finnish professional footballer who plays for FC Inter Turku, as a midfielder.

References

2000 births
Living people
Finnish footballers
FC Inter Turku players
Veikkausliiga players
Association football midfielders